Sonata Primitive is a copper 1940–1948 sculpture by Saul Baizerman, installed in the San Diego Museum of Art's May S. Marcy Sculpture Garden, in the U.S. state of California.

References

1940s sculptures
Copper sculptures in the United States
Outdoor sculptures in San Diego
Sculptures of the San Diego Museum of Art